The Chinese American Museum is a museum in Los Angeles, California.

Chinese American Museum may also refer to:

 Chinese American Museum of Chicago, Illinois
 Museum of Chinese in America, New York City
 Chinese American Museum DC, Washington, DC

See also
Chinese Museum (disambiguation), including several in America